Barkal may refer to the following places:

Barkal Upazila, a sub-district of Rangamati District in the Division of Chittagong, Bangladesh
Jebel Barkal, a mountain in Karima town in Northern State, Sudan